In combinatorics, a branch of mathematics, a weighted matroid is a matroid endowed with function with respect to which one can perform a greedy algorithm.

A matroid with an associated weight function is called a weighted matroid.

Spanning forest algorithms
As a simple example, say we wish to find the maximum spanning forest of a graph. That is, given a graph and a weight for each edge, find a forest containing every vertex and maximizing the total weight of the edges in the tree. This problem arises in some clustering applications. If we look at the definition of the forest matroid above, we see that the maximum spanning forest is simply the independent set with largest total weight — such a set must span the graph, for otherwise we can add edges without creating cycles. But how do we find it?

Finding a basis
There is a simple algorithm for finding a basis:

 Initially let  be the empty set.
 For each  in 

The result is clearly an independent set. Thus if we pass up an element, we'll never have an opportunity to use it later. We will generalize this algorithm to solve a harder problem.

Extension to optimal
An independent set of largest total weight is called an optimal set. Optimal sets are always bases, because if an edge can be added, it should be; this only increases the total weight. As it turns out, there is a trivial greedy algorithm for computing an optimal set of a weighted matroid. It works as follows:

 Initially let  be the empty set.

This algorithm finds a basis, since it is a special case of the above algorithm. It always chooses the element of largest weight that it can while preserving independence (thus the term "greedy"). This always produces an optimal set: suppose that it produces  and that .

Complexity analysis
This requires  time using a comparison sorting algorithm.

If we want to find a minimum spanning tree instead, we simply "invert" the weight function by subtracting it from a large constant. More specifically, let , where  exceeds the total weight over all graph edges. Many more optimization problems about all sorts of matroids and weight functions can be solved in this trivial way, although in many cases more efficient algorithms can be found that exploit more specialized properties.

Matroid requirement
Note also that if we take a set  of "independent" sets which is a down-set but not a matroid, then the greedy algorithm will not always work.

History

It was not until 1971 that Jack Edmonds connected weighted matroids to greedy algorithms in his paper       "Matroids and the greedy algorithm". Korte and Lovász would generalize these ideas to objects called greedoids, which allow even larger classes of problems to be solved by greedy algorithms.

References
 Jack Edmonds. Matroids and the Greedy Algorithm. Mathematical Programming, volume 1, p. 125–136. 1971.

Matroid theory